New York University School of Law has produced many influential alumni in law, government, business, academia and society. Notable alumni of NYU Law include those named on the following lists.

Legal academia

Press, literature, education and arts

Yoram Dinstein, President of Tel Aviv University

Sports

Business

Politics and government

Members of the United States Congress

Judiciary

Government, international organizations and other

Joel Steinberg (born 1941), attorney convicted of manslaughter

References

Lists of people by university or college in New York City

New York University-related lists